S. Kamaraj (born 27 May 1964) is an Indian politician and was a member of the 14th Tamil Nadu Legislative Assembly from the Krishnarayapuram constituency, which is reserved for candidates from the Scheduled Castes. He represented the All India Anna Dravida Munnetra Kazhagam party.

Kamaraj was born in Karur on 27 May 1964. He is married, has three children and was previously a member of Enam Karur Municipality

References 

1964 births
Tamil Nadu MLAs 2011–2016
All India Anna Dravida Munnetra Kazhagam politicians
Living people
People from Karur district
Amma Makkal Munnetra Kazhagam politicians